The Academy of Theatre, Radio, Film and Television ( or AGRFT) is an academy of the University of Ljubljana in Ljubljana, Slovenia. It is the only college and graduate school in Slovenia with a similar curriculum. It is composed of three colleges: the College for Theatre and Radio, the College for Film and Television, and College for Screen and Play Writing. In addition, a Center for Theatre and Film Studies is included in the academy. The current dean is Aleš Valič.

History
The academy was founded in 1945. At the beginning, it was only an academy for theatre. Gradually, the sections for radio, film and television studies were added to the curriculum. In 1963 the academy adopted its current name. Since 1975 it has been an autonomous member of the University of Ljubljana, along with the Academy of Music and the Academy of Fine Arts and Design.

The academy offers both undergraduate and graduate study programs, including internships in all available fields.

Professors
Notable professors have included:
 Darja Švajger, singer
 Karpo Godina, film director
 Jožica Avbelj, actress
 Meta Hočevar, stage director, screenwriter, art decorator, costume designer
 Andrej Inkret, theatre critic
 Dušan Jovanović, playwright, director
 Primož Kozak, playwright and essayist
 Mile Korun, stage director
 Pino Mlakar, choreographer
 Franci Slak, director, producer, screenwriter
 Josip Vidmar, literary critic and theorist
 Matjaž Zupančič, director, playwright

Notes

References
 Dekleva, Tatjana (1996) Akademija za gledališče, radio, film in televizijo - 50 let - 1946-1996 (Academy for Theatre, Radio, Film and Television - 50 years - 1946-1996) University of Ljubljana, Ljubljana
 Michieli, Barbara Sušec (2006) Zakaj?: Akademija za gledališče, radio, film in televizijo: zbornik ob šestdesetletnici 1946-2006 Akademija za gledališče, Ljubljana,

External links
 Academy of Theatre, Radio, Film and Television. Official website.
 

Theatre
Art schools in Ljubljana
Film schools in Slovenia
Schools of the performing arts
Drama schools
Media studies
Educational institutions established in 1945
Mass media in Ljubljana
1945 establishments in Yugoslavia